Stuart Fox (born 1978 in Birmingham, England) is a professional poker player who started off playing online poker and has now become one of the United Kingdom's most recognized and successful tournament players.

Poker career
As of 2010, his live tournament winnings exceed $1,200,000.  His 8 cashes at the WSOP account for $698,561 of those winnings.

WPT 
He has several cashes from the World Poker Tour.

References 

1978 births
Living people
English poker players